Stars & Stripes is a line of generic soft drinks manufactured by Cott Beverages. It is sold in the United States, Mexico and China.

Description
Like other generic soda brands, Stars & Stripes comes in various flavors. Currently, the beverage is offered in cola, diet cola, grape, lemonade, Loopy Limon (lemon-lime), Mountain Citrus, orange, pink lemonade, and root beer varieties. They also used to sell a Pineapple flavor, however that has been discontinued. Stars & Stripes sodas contain both high fructose corn syrup and aspartame (generic NutraSweet). The drinks are sold in both bottles and cans.

Stars & Stripes is most often sold at dollar stores, however it is most commonly seen at Dollar Tree.

References

Soft drinks